Lee Sang-don (born August 12, 1985) is a South Korean football player who currently plays for Goyang Hi FC. His younger brother Lee Sang-ho is also a footballer.

Career statistics

References

1985 births
Living people
South Korean footballers
Suwon Samsung Bluewings players
Ulsan Hyundai FC players
Gangwon FC players
Goyang Zaicro FC players
K League 1 players
K League 2 players
Association football midfielders